Saryaqos (from ) is a village in the Khanka markaz located in the Qalyubiyya Governorate in Egypt, in the northern part of the Cairo metropolitan area, at the start of the Nile Delta. in 2006, it had a population of 22,805.

Overview 
Saryaqos is the village that is Northern agricultural frontier of Cairo and this make it having a cultural influence that can be observed all over Egypt, as there are some traditional foods and drinks bearing the name of Saryaqos, such as (Saryaqosy Coffee) (Egyptian Arabic: قهوة سرياقوسي), which is a traditional Egyptian way of making 
coffee, and some other things that do not necessarily come from that village, but they take a common name for things coming from the northern Egyptian countryside in general.

Politics 
Muhammed Abd El-Wahid is representing Saryaqos as part of the Khanka markaz in the Egyptian Parliament in the 2020 elections, And it is now under the rule of the governor of Qalyubia, Abdul Hamid Al-Hajjan.

History

Ancient Egypt 
Saryaqos was an agricultural area in the southern part of the tenth nome of ancient Lower Egypt (Egyptian: 𓈪 pronunced kA wr:) 32.1 km in the southern east direction from the nome,s capital Athribis (Egyptian: 𓉗𓏏𓉐𓇾𓁷𓄣𓊖).

Middle Ages 
The beginning of the prosperity of Saryaqos was in the middle ages, especially in the era of the Mamluk Sultanate 1323 AC, and it was mentioned in the manuscripts of the Egyptian historian Al-Maqrizi as he had said:

And that khnaqah the historian Al-Maqrizi referred to was a center of Saryaqos and then people started calling it al khanka (Egyptian Arabic: الخانكة), but this khnaqah disappeared with the passage of time.and the historian Ibn Taghribirdi talked about palaces that was located there in his book (Al-Nujum Al-Zahira Fi Muluk Misr Wa'l-Qahira) when he mentioned the Sultanate of Al-Nasir Muhammad Ibn Qalawun as he had said:

Then Ibn Taghribirdi explained that the palaces were destroyed and became rubble due to the decay of construction in Saryaqos after the reign of the Sultan Al-Nasir Muhammad Ibn Qalawun.  when he talked about the prince Soudon in his book (Al-Manhal) as he had said:

Modern History 
The description of Saryaqos in Al-Maqrizi's book generally applies more to the nearby city of El-Khankah. The current village may be an extension of the old village, as it is on the eastern bank of the Ismailia Canal, Which was not completed before 1863.

After the Arab Spring, indiscriminate construction spread in an unprecedented manner in the Nile Delta countryside, and until the Egyptian President Abdel Fattah Al-Sisi completely prevented construction in the village, it ended up, along with some other villages,  connecting with the city of El-Marg in the south and the city of El-Khanka in the east, to make together a huge city of slums interspersed with some agricultural patches, but it remains administratively separate anyway.

References 

 Ibn Taghribirdi,s book  (Al-Nujum al-zahira fi muluk Misr wa'l-Qahira).
 Muhammed Ramzi,s book (Geographical Dictionary of Egypt: From the Era of the Ancient Egyptians to the Year 1945).
 Muhammed Abd El_Wahed,s page on the Egyptian parlement site.

Populated places in Qalyubiyya Governorate